USS Lu-O-La (SP-520) was a United States Navy patrol vessel in commission from 1917 to 1919.

Lu-O-La was built in 1912 as a private motorboat of the same name by George Lawley & Son at Neponset, Massachusetts. On 1 May 1917, the U.S. Navy acquired her under a free lease from her owner, James Sprunt of Wilmington, North Carolina, for use as a section patrol vessel during World War I. She was enrolled in the Naval Coast Defense Reserve on 8 June 1917, taken over by the Navy on 24 August 1917, and commissioned as USS Lu-O-La (SP-520) on 17 September 1917 at Wilmington.

Assigned to the 6th Naval District, Lu-O-La was based at Wilmington and operated on section patrol duty through the end of World War I. Serving as a dispatch boat and harbor boat, she performed messenger duty out of Wilmington and patrolled between Wilmington and Cape Fear, North Carolina, while engaged in dispatch duty.

Lu-O-La was decommissioned on 10 January 1919 and returned to Sprunt the same day.

References

Department of the Navy Naval History and Heritage Command Online Library of Selected Images: U.S. Navy Ships - Listed by hull number: "SP" #s and "ID" #s -- World War I Era Patrol Vessels and other Acquired Ships and Craft numbered from SP-500 through SP-599
NavSource Online: Section Patrol Craft Photo Archive: Lu-O-La (SP 520)

Patrol vessels of the United States Navy
World War I patrol vessels of the United States
Ships built in Boston
1912 ships